The 1976 European Cup Winners' Cup Final was a football match between West Ham United of England and Anderlecht of Belgium. The final was held at Heysel Stadium in Brussels on 5 May 1976. It was the final match of the 1975–76 European Cup Winners' Cup tournament and the 16th European Cup Winners' Cup final.

Route to the final

Match

Summary
Pat Holland put West Ham into the lead in the 28th minute. Just before half-time, Frank Lampard misjudged a back pass, allowing Peter Ressel to collect the ball and pass it to Rob Rensenbrink to score the equaliser. In attempting the backpass, Lampard tore a stomach muscle that ruled him out of much of the remainder of the game. Three minutes into the second-half, François van der Elst scored, assisted by Rensenbrink. Keith Robson later equalised for West Ham from a cross by Trevor Brooking. Anderlecht were awarded a clear penalty in the 73rd minute, after Holland rashly challenged and fouled Rensenbrink who then scored from the penalty. Holland obviously misjudged the tackle and was duly penalised. With two minutes left, as West Ham fell apart, van der Elst ran through to score Anderlecht's fourth goal for a deserved victory.

Details

See also
1975–76 European Cup Winners' Cup
1976 European Cup Final
1976 UEFA Cup Final
R.S.C. Anderlecht in European football
West Ham United F.C. in European football

External links
UEFA Cup Winners' Cup results at Rec.Sport.Soccer Statistics Foundation
1976 European Cup Winners' Cup Final at UEFA.com

3
UEFA Cup Winners' Cup Finals
Cup Winners' Cup Final 1976
Cup Winners' Cup Final 1976
European Cup Winners Cup Final, 1976
International club association football competitions hosted by Belgium
UEFA
May 1976 sports events in Europe
1970s in Brussels
Sports competitions in Brussels